The 1949 LFF Lyga was the 28th season of the LFF Lyga football competition in Lithuania.  It was contested by 15 teams, and Elnias Šiauliai won the championship.

League standings

Playoff
Elnias Šiauliai 1-0 Inkaras Kaunas

References
RSSSF

LFF Lyga seasons
1949 in Lithuanian sport
Lith